Jason of Thessalonica was a Jewish convert and early Christian believer mentioned in the New Testament in  and . 

Jason is venerated as a saint in Catholic and Orthodox traditions. His feast day is July 12 in the Roman Catholic Church, April 28 in the Slavic Christian tradition, and April 29 in the Greek Christian tradition. His feast is celebrated on the 3rd of Pashons in the Coptic Orthodox Church.  Finally, he is commemorated on January 4 among the Seventy Apostles.

Biblical account
In Acts 17 his house in Thessalonica was used as a refuge by the apostles Paul, Silas, and Timothy. Some Thessalonian Jews were annoyed with Paul's remarks in the synagogue and not finding him and Silas, hauled Jason before the city authorities, where he was fined and released.

Paul referred to Jason, Lucius and Sosipater as his "countrymen" in Romans 16:21, which has led some to call him "Jason of Tarsus" (since Paul was from Tarsus). However, most scholars understand Paul's use of "countryman" here and elsewhere to mean "fellow Jew". Both references to Jason point 'very probably'  to the same person. Vlatades Monastery in Thessaloniki is believed to have been built on the former site of Jason's house.

Hagiography
The literary source (hagiographic legend) of the life of Jason and Sosipater was newly edited and translated by B. Kindt as appendix to "La version longue du récit légendaire de l'évangelisation de Corfou par les saints Jason and Sosipatre," Analecta Bollandiana 116 (1998) 259–295.

Born in Tarsus, he was appointed Bishop of Tarsus by the Apostle Paul. With the apostle Sosipater he traveled to the island of Corfu, where they built a church in honor of the Apostle Stephen the Protomartyr and converted many pagans to the Christian faith. Seeing this, the king of Corfu threw them into prison where they converted seven other prisoners to the Christian faith: Saturninus, Jakischolus, Faustianus, Januarius, Marsalius, Euphrasius and Mammius. The king had those seven put to death in boiling pitch for their faith.

The king's daughter, the virgin Cercyra, having watched these holy apostles being tortured, turned to the Christian faith and distributed all her jewels to the poor. The king became angry and put her in prison, yet she would not deny Christ. So he had the prison burned, but she remained unharmed. Many people were baptized upon seeing this miracle. He then had her killed with arrows while tied to a tree.

Many believers fled to a nearby island to get away from the enraged king, but as he chased them, his boat sank. The new king embraced the Christian faith and in baptism received the name Sebastian. From then on Sosipater and Jason freely preached the Gospel and built up the Church in Corfu until a very old age, when they gave up their souls to God.

See also 
 Acts 17
 First Epistle to the Thessalonians
 Sosipater
 Lucius of Cyrene
 Nikolai Velimirovic, The Prologue of Ohrid

References

External links
Jason & Sosipater the Apostles of the 70 & their Companions (GOARCH)
Analecta Bollandiana 
Catholic Online: Jason of Tarsus

Seventy disciples
Christian saints from the New Testament
Saints from Roman Anatolia
1st-century bishops in Roman Anatolia
People from Tarsus, Mersin
People in Acts of the Apostles
People in the Pauline epistles
1st-century Jews